Robin Jacques  (27 March 1920 – 18 March 1995) was a British illustrator whose work was published in more than 100 novels and children's books. He is notable for his long collaboration with Ruth Manning-Sanders, illustrating many of her collections of fairy tales from all over the world. In much of his work, Jacques employed the stippling technique.

He was quoted as saying: "My preference is for children's books of the more imaginative and fanciful kind, since these leave greater scope for illustrative invention, where I feel most at home. Thus, my work with Ruth Manning-Sanders has proved most satisfying, and the twenty-five books we have done together contain much of the work that I feel personally happiest with."

Biography
Jacques (born Jaques) was the son of World War One pilot Robin Jaques and his wife, Mary. His sister Hattie Jacques became a well-known actress. When his sister added a 'c' to her surname, he did as well.  Jacques taught himself to be an artist and began working in an advertising agency in his teens. Although he had no formal art training, he enjoyed drawing and used anatomy books, items in the Victoria and Albert Museum, and objects in his surroundings for his instruction.

Jacques was art editor for Strand magazine and art director for the Central Office of Information. He began teaching at Harrow College of Art in 1973 and at Canterbury Art College and Wimbledon Art College in 1975.

Jacques was prolific: he illustrated over 100 novels and children's books from the 1940s to the 1980s, most notably the fairy-tale compilations of Ruth Manning-Sanders – mainly the 22-volume "A Book of ..." series from Methuen Publishing (E.P. Dutton in the United States), 1962 to 1984. He rocvided illustrations for Lilliput and Radio Times.

His work is notable for its detail, its expressive characters and the virtuosic use of stippling.

"Illustration is something other than superlative drawing or a display of technical know-how. Unlike painting and sculpture, an illustration has a direct function... Illustration can never be a private exercise in graphic experiment unrelated to a specific purpose. Where it becomes this, it may be in itself enormously interesting but it will, by definition, no longer be illustration."

Personal life
In 1943, Jacques married Patricia Bamford, daughter of engineer Robert Bamford, co-founder of Aston Martin, and fashion designer Matilda Etches, and they had one son, John Paul Jacques. After her death he married Azetta van der Merwe in 1958, and after her death, he married Alexandra Mann (died 1995), which ended in divorce.

References

Other sources
 A Web site about Jacques 
 A Web site about Jacques' illustrations for covers of C.S. Forester novels
 Obituary from The Independent, London 
 John Clute and John Grant, The Encyclopedia of Fantasy (1999 updated paperback edition)
 Robin Jacques, Illustrator

Further reading
 Ian Rogerson, Robin Jacques an artist of sustained brilliance. A checklist ... (2008)
 Robin Jacques, Illustrators at Work (1963. Studio Books)
 John Keir Cross, 'The Drawings of Robin Jacques', in Alphabet and Image; 7 (1948 May), p. 33-45

External links
 
 

1920 births
1995 deaths
British speculative fiction artists
English illustrators
Fantasy artists
20th-century illustrators of fairy tales